The Galactic Republic, often referred to as simply the Republic, is a fictional galactic polity depicted in the Star Wars universe, where it existed prior to the establishment of the Galactic Empire. The Republic is most prominently portrayed in the prequel trilogy of films in the Star Wars franchise. In the original trilogy, set later in time, it is referred to as the Old Republic.

The Republic is portrayed as a democratic republic that has sustained itself peacefully for over twenty-five thousand years, but was tied up in layers of bureaucracy. It was mainly overseen by the Galactic Senate, the Republic's legislative branch. It was protected by the Jedi Order, the guardians of peace and justice throughout the Star Wars galaxy. After the end of the Galactic Empire, the New Republic was founded. It was enforced by the original Rebel Alliance, eventually known as the New Republic Military. The consolidation of the New Republic is depicted in The Mandalorian as it sought to wipe out remnants of the Imperial forces, and was eventually destroyed by the First Order, under Supreme Leader Snoke's direction, in Star Wars: The Force Awakens.

Fictional history (canon)

Fictional timeline (canon) 

All Star Wars chronology takes the destruction of the first Death Star during the Battle of Yavin, portrayed in the first film Star Wars: Episode IV – A New Hope (1977), as the basis of counting standard years. The conventional calendar era notation is "BBY" ("Before the Battle of Yavin") and "ABY" ("After the Battle of Yavin"). Alternatively, newer literature may use the notation "BSW4" ("Before Star Wars Episode 4") and "ASW4" ("After Star Wars Episode 4").

Background 
Little is said to be known of the earliest history of the Star Wars galaxy before the Republic, but several species that evolved in the Core Worlds, including humans, later came to dominate the galaxy. It is hypothesised that humans originally came from Coruscant, later settled other Core Worlds such as Alderaan, and went on to colonise other planets from there. Smith (1996) claimed that "[i]t is unknown whether hyperdrive was invented by the humans of the Core Worlds or introduced by alien traders from far off in the Unknown Regions", but there is agreement that the introduction of hyperspace travel predated the Republic, and allowed the formation of a "galactic civilization" and central governments over multiple planetary systems, and thus the rise of the Republic.

Old Republic 
According to the large body of films and other fiction that belong to the Star Wars franchise, the Old Republic was formed 25,000 years before the events of Star Wars: Episode IV – A New Hope (1977) when the first "Galactic Constitution" was signed on Coruscant, after hyperdrive connected many worlds in the Core and enabled the establishment of an interstellar central government. Coruscant became the capital planet of the Old Republic, the Galactic Empire, and the New Republic, and the entire surface evolved into one big city, with skyscrapers reaching more than 5,000 levels. The Republic was made up of several hundred thousands of worlds, and each planet or system had representation in the Republic Senate, which comprised most of the Republic Legislative Branch and the government itself. It started off merely as an economic and protective alliance, mainly among the Core worlds. It eventually expanded to the Colonies and other outlying worlds and regions, becoming a superpower rather than an alliance, and it became the central government for the galaxy. The Core Worlds such as Coruscant and Alderaan were notable for their prosperity, which was later matched by the Colonies, while the Inner Rim and Expansion Region were a bit less secure and wealthy; the Mid Rim was an unsafe region that saw much of the fighting Galactic Civil War on planets such as Naboo and Kashyyyk, as it was far from the Republic's military concentrated in the Core. The Outer Rim was the most unsafe place in the galaxy, where neither the Republic nor the Empire ever gained much de facto hold, leading to lawlessness, widespread violence and crime syndicates; many key battles of the Clone Wars took place here. A large part of the Outer Rim including Tatooine was traditionally ruled by the Hutts and therefore called the Hutt Space.

As the Republic expanded, it came into contact with the slave empire of Zygerria. Because slavery was disallowed in the Republic, it disliked the Zygerria Empire, as slavery was central to the Empire's political and economic system; conversely, the Empire refused to become part of the Republic. The Republic and Jedi declared war on the Empire and won. The Empire was reduced to a small harmless alliance on Zygerria.

Sith Empire and reforms 
The Sith (which formed in the Republic's early years) return to their original strength and invaded Malachor. The first Sith War began, which led to the demise of the first Republic. The power of the new Sith Empire increased as the Republic's decreased. The Republic and Jedi forces failed to keep the Empire's Forces out of Republic Space. Soon, the Sith became a second superpower. Around this time, an ancestor of Pre Vizsla stole the Darksaber from the Jedi Temple. Around 1000 years prior to Star Wars, the Dark Age began, and the Old Republic was brought to the brink of collapse, but with the Liberation of Coruscant, the Sith Empire collapsed first. After the Sith Empire was defeated in c. 1032 BBY, the Republic (now known as the Galactic Republic) reformed and became a democracy. It demilitarized at the Ruusan Reformation, shortly after the Seventh Battle of Ruusan.

High Republic 
The multimedia project Star Wars: The High Republic depicts the galaxy 200 years before The Phantom Menace.

The Republic began to diplomatically influence its neighboring worlds rather than conquering them by force. This meant the Republic expanded slowly. The Republic finally took control of the Mid Rim.
Power blocs formed out of the Republic, but the Jedi kept order. The Republic became peaceful but corrupt, and a Core-Rim distrust formed. After Supreme Chancellor Finis Valorum came to power, a standoff between the Trade Federation and the Republic led to the Invasion of Naboo (32 BBY), depicted in Star Wars: Episode I – The Phantom Menace.

Separatist Crisis 

Several trade organizations represented in the Senate, such as the Trade Federation and Commerce Guild, kept armies of droids to protect their profits and occasionally took advantage of this, such as when the Trade Federation invaded and occupied Naboo. Individual sectors also maintained their own security forces, such as Naboo Security Force or the CorSec from Corellia, and these were sometimes used to combat small threats. However, there was no centralized and official military of the Republic. The Trade Federation and other cartels within the Republic desired that the Republic government lack significant central military power so that it could not enforce any legal regulations on their business.

Dissatisfied with several problems in the Republic, such as ineffectual government, heavy taxes, and perceived favoritism of the Core Worlds over the Outer Rim planets, the Confederacy of Independent Systems (CIS) was formed in 24 BBY: several systems seceded from the Republic and formed a new state, thus triggering the Separatist Crisis. The CIS was ostensibly headed by former Jedi Master Count Dooku (although Palpatine was actually in command of both sides), who gained much popularity amongst critics of the Republic after his scathing Raxus Address outlining the problems of the Republic, leading many systems to side with him and form the Confederacy. The Separatists became a huge threat to the Republic after some of the galaxy's megacorporations allied with the CIS, as they possessed vast resources and private armies of battle droids. A Military Creation Act was proposed in the Republic Senate, strongly opposed by many of the Republic's pacifist leaders, such as Padmé Amidala, the Queen of Naboo, who feared the possibility of war. But most of the Senate advocated a permanent, official, and central military to oppose the Separatist threat. Supporters of the Act include Orn Free Taa of Ryloth and Ask Aak of Malastare.

However, a Clone Army had already been created in secret on the planet Kamino on the edge of the galaxy ten years earlier, commissioned without authorization by Master Sifo-Dyas, a former Jedi perceiving chaos in the galaxy. When it became clear the Confederacy had no intention of negotiating, the Republic quickly accepted the Army made for them, and it was dubbed the Grand Army of the Republic.

Clone Wars 

Despite the high quality of its armaments and cloned troops, the Republic's war effort was initially hindered because most of the major industrial companies in the Galaxy had, under the aegis of the Techno Union, sided with the Confederacy. Eventually, though, the Republic became a humongous superpower not only economically but also militarily. The rapid militarization of the Republic during the Clone Wars, overseen by Supreme Chancellor Palpatine, had far-reaching effects. The Confederacy won most battles in the first year of the Clone Wars. During the second and middle year of the Clone Wars however, the Republic defended itself from Confederate attacks and retaliated with its own assaults, many of which were successful. During the third and final year of the Clone Wars, the Republic won many offensive battles in the Mid Rim and pushed the Confederate forces back to the Outer Rim with its "Outer Rim Sieges" campaign.

Fall of the Republic 
During the Clone Wars, the Senate increasingly grants enormous amounts of power to Palpatine, who is the Commander-in-Chief. Such actions are justified in the name of security and are considered a perfectly reasonable way to increase the wartime government's efficiency. Eventually, Palpatine gains enough political power that he and his office are equal to the Senate.

Tension between Palpatine and the Jedi grow as the war progresses. Many members of the Jedi Council remain skeptical of Palpatine's growing power. In time, the Jedi believe that Palpatine will not surrender his emergency powers and his long overdue position by the end of the war. This suspicion is also shared by some senators, including Padmé Amidala of Naboo, Bail Organa of Alderaan, and Mon Mothma of Chandrila.

After the death of Separatist leaders Count Dooku, who was the Head of State, and General Grievous, who was the Commander of the Separatist Army, and the discovery that Palpatine is actually Darth Sidious, the Sith Lord behind the war, the Jedi activate their contingency plans.

Order 66 
The Sith are the ancient enemy of the Jedi and were thought to have been destroyed 1000 years ago. A small group of experienced Jedi led by Mace Windu fail to arrest Palpatine for treason when Anakin Skywalker pledges himself to the dark side. Shortly afterwards, Palpatine secretly orders the clones to exterminate the Jedi Order. Because of control chips implanted inside the clones' heads, the clones are forced to slaughter the Jedi leaders in what would later become known as the Great Jedi Purge. The Jedi Padawans remaining on Coruscant are eliminated by Darth Vader, formerly known as Anakin Skywalker, and his personal legion.

Galactic Empire vs. Rebel Alliance 

Before the conclusion of the Clone Wars, Palpatine addressed the Senate. He related the story of an unsuccessful "assassination attempt" on his life by the Jedi. Claiming that it was a "rebellion" and that their next move would be to kill all the Senators, he declared the Jedi Order to be enemies of the Republic. Palpatine announced that the Galactic Republic should be reorganized into the Galactic Empire, and he should be the emperor for life. Deluded by Palpatine's charisma and skill (and perhaps also by his considerable dark side power), the majority of the Senate cheered him on loudly in approval.  The official continuation of the Galactic Republic was the Galactic Empire, which was fueled by cruelty and fear.

As the Clone Wars entered their final year, Palpatine's once near-unanimous support had begun to falter. As depicted in the Star Wars: Episode III – Revenge of the Sith novelization and deleted scenes from the film itself, a bloc of senators began to emerge, even before the Clone Wars end, who opposed Palpatine's authoritarian rule and resented his treatment of the Jedi and other opponents. This bloc, originally led by influential politicians such as Bail Organa, Mon Mothma, and later by Bail's adopted daughter Princess Leia Organa, eventually became the political voice of the emerging Rebel Alliance.

New Republic 

The New Republic was a restoration of the Galactic Republic after Palpatine's Galactic Empire was crushed following Palpatine's death and the destruction of the second Death Star in the Battle of Endor in 4 ABY. After the fall of the Emperor, remnants of the Empire were ordered to initiate "Operation: Cinder", a contingency plan created by Palpatine to annihilate both its organization, its followers and its enemies as an act of punishment for failing to prevent his demise, including the planets they have controlled. The Rebels however prevented the Empire's self-destruction in the Battle of Jakku, finally ending Palpatine's reign over the galaxy. In 28 ABY, part of the New Republic, concerned about corruption emerging in the Senate and its unwillingness to see the First Order as a major threat, created the Resistance to fight the First Order. The New Republic is first portrayed onscreen in Star Wars: The Force Awakens (2015), where it is depicted as the ruling government of the galaxy and primary target of the First Order, a neo-Imperialist military junta that sought to reclaim the Empire’s legacy. 30 years after the events portrayed in Return of the Jedi (1983), the New Republic effectively collapsed when the First Order's Starkiller Base destroyed Hosnian Prime and the New Republic fleet and Senate with its phantom energy beam. In Star Wars: The Rise of Skywalker (2019), after the Battle of Exegol, Rey, a reformed Ben Solo and the Resistance have successfully put a end of both the First Order, the Sith Eternal, and the resurrected Palpatine, making way for the Republic to be reborn anew.

Legends
The successor government to the Empire was explored as early as Marvel Comics' self-titled Star Wars series, which ran until 1986. The New Republic per se debuted in the 1991 Star Wars Legends novel, Heir to the Empire, by author Timothy Zahn.

Institutions

Senate, Chancellor and Jedi Order 

The Republic begins as a mutual protection and economic alliance among a number of planets in the Core. Each member world or system chooses a Senator to represent them in the Galactic Senate, the main body of the legislative branch of the government. Senators are ambassadors of their homeworlds or systems. Member worlds and systems maintain their governments and societies as long as it does not defy any central and core Republican laws. There are a wide variety of different local governments along the political spectrum: from monarchies to republics to hive-like communes.

When the Republic's power and influence expand, many new areas of the galaxy are incorporated into the Republic. The Core and Colonies are the base of the Galactic Republic. A reorganization of senatorial representation occurs 1,000 years prior to Star Wars during the Ruusan Reformation. The most common organization for these new territories is to group regions into Sectors of about 50 inhabited worlds. Each sector is represented by a Senatorial Delegation. When the number of sectors becomes too large, sectors are organized into roughly a thousand regions, each represented by one delegation to the Senate.

The Senate serves as the unicameral main body of the legislative branch, but has immense power over the entire Galactic Republic. The capital of the Republic, which contains the most political power and wealth, is Coruscant.

Inside the Senate Building, there is an area in which the Senate debates, casts votes, and makes or passes bills. It contains 1,024 floating platforms, each of which contain a senator and his or her aides. Each platform in the senate represents a "sector" of the galaxy. A few platforms represent individual worlds of high importance, or worlds bringing special pleas to the Senate. Some represent special interest groups such as the Trade Federation, and other companies, corporations, and industries. Each senatorial delegation has one vote.

The members of the Senate elect a Supreme Chancellor from among their ranks who serves as the Senate's presiding officer and as the Republic's de facto leader. The Chancellor is assisted by the Vice Chair, who is presumably elected in the same manner as the Chancellor; the same Vice Chair is present throughout the entire prequel trilogy. The Senate follows pseudo-parliamentary rules. Supreme Chancellor Finis Valorum was forced out of office by the Senate in a motion of no confidence, introduced by Queen Padmé Amidala of Naboo, for example.

Senators receive one vote in all matters, procedural and substantive. The Chancellor is elected from within the Senate for a set term. The Senate gives the Chancellor emergency powers in times of crisis and removes him from office when necessary. The assembly is in turn divided into individual committees, each specializing in specific fields of government administration, and which were responsible for creating legislation to be reviewed by the full assembly. The Senate has some form of judicial power as well, although the Republic has a judicial branch, in which the Supreme Court was the main body.

The main functions of the Senate are to mediate disputes between members, provide for the common defense, create and pass laws into effect that would benefit most of the Republic, and regulate inter-system trade. The Jedi Order, although technically not officially part of the Republic, are considered the defenders of the general Republic. The Republic often orders the Jedi to specific areas that require assistance. In this way, they are eventually the unofficial police force of the Republic. They become representatives of the Senate as well, to some extent.

Despite the seemingly organized structure of the Republic, the waning years of the Republic are a time of corruption and great social injustice. The Senate becomes divided between those who genuinely wish to uphold the values and ideals of the Republic and those who wish to further their own goals. Following a series of weak and ineffectual Chancellors, there is a crisis involving the invasion of Naboo by the Trade Federation over a tariff passed by the Senate.

After Senator Palpatine of Naboo becomes Chancellor, he increases the power of the office, from acting as commander-in-chief of the Grand Army of the Republic, or the Republic Military, to the institution of his personal bodyguard organization, the Red Guard. The Office of the Supreme Chancellor is given power equaling that of the Senate. The Galactic Senate also meets less often, as the Chancellor is voted more emergency powers to act on his own during the time of crisis.

Eventually, many Outer Rim planets and companies leave the Republic due to the amount of corruption and unfair treatment to Outer Rim worlds. Together, they form a rebellion known as the Confederacy of Independent Systems, almost exclusively referred to in the films as the Separatists. Some large industrial companies, including the Trade Federation, side with the Separatists, providing them with their military and its resources.

Galactic politicians
Politicians include Senators, the Supreme Chancellor, the Vice Chair of the Senate, the Administrative Aide, various Representatives from systems, and to an unofficial extent, the members of the Jedi Council. Jedi Council members hold special status as they appear to have the ability to watch Senate meetings and advise such Senators on various matters. The Jedi order protects these people.

Military 
While the Republic had an Army and Navy for thousands of years, after the Rusaan Reformations, the Republic does not maintain a military except for a small force known as the Judicial Forces.

Palpatine and the Jedi 
The Jedi with the most authority served on the Jedi High Council, among whom Yoda and Mace Windu act as  leaders at the height of the Republic. Although the Senate holds some degree of political authority over the Jedi, very little pressure was ever put on the Council before Palpatine took office and demanded that Anakin Skywalker become a member of the Council in Star Wars: Episode III - Revenge of the Sith, despite the misgivings of the Jedi. While the Council allowed Anakin to sit among them, they did not grant him the status of Jedi Master.

Reception and analysis 

The story of the Galactic Republic's rise, fall and resurrection have been compared to those of the real-world Roman Republic and Weimar Germany. The story of its "fall and redemption" has also been compared to that of Anakin Skywalker.

Brake and Chase (2016) compared the hypothesised colonisation of the Core Worlds by Coruscanti humans to the state of the space colonisation by humans from the Earth, which had taken its first step with NASA's Apollo program of 1961–1972, just before George Lucas invented Star Wars. They argued that Lucas offered a solution to the Fermi paradox: indeed, most of the Star Wars galaxy was conquered/colonised and submitted to the central government of the Republic rather quickly by the expansionist humans from the Core Worlds soon after they acquired the necessary rocket technology for interstellar travel, but there are still large unchartered Unknown Regions which are simply too far from the fashionable Core Worlds to have been fully explored (as exploration of the Unknown Regions is lethally dangerous), let alone colonised. Thus, it's possible that the Solar System is also situated "in the Milky Way's version of the Unknown Regions", and that even if there are other species in the Milky Way, which may even have established a Star Wars-like Galactic Republic or Empire, the Earth and its human civilisation have so far been in unchartered and dangerous hyperspace-travel territory (from that galactic civilisation's point of view), and humans themselves are still too technologically limited to make contact with it.

Silvio (2007) posits that Star Wars films should be understood as being heavily influenced by the time in which they were created. The prequel trilogy where the Galactic Republic was first depicted was influenced by the presidency of George W. Bush, including the war on terror, the Iraq War, and the increased U.S. security apparatus with the Patriot Act. Anakin Skywalker's line "If you're not with me, then you're my enemy" is an echo of Bush's war on terror dichotomy that "Either you are with us, or you are with the terrorists." George Lucas even confirmed that Padmé Amidala's line "So this is how liberty dies... to thunderous applause" invokes the Bush administration's passing of the Patriot Act and Wars in Iraq and Afghanistan without public scrutiny.

Appearances in the chronological order 
 Star Wars: The Phantom Menace (1999) (First appearance) 
 Star Wars: Attack of the Clones (2002)
 Star Wars: The Clone Wars (2008 animated film)
 Star Wars: The Clone Wars (2008−2020)
 Star Wars: Revenge of the Sith (2005)
 Star Wars: The Bad Batch (2021−present) (Briefly)
 Andor (2022−present) (Symbol and mentioned only)
 Star Wars: Rebels (2014−2018) (Symbol and mentioned only)
 Star Wars: A New Hope (1977) (First mentioned)
 Star Wars: The Empire Strikes Back (Mentioned only)
 The Mandalorian (2019–present) (Mentioned only)
 The Book of Boba Fett (2021–present) (Mentioned only)

New Republic appearances in the chronological order
 Star Wars: Rebels (2014–2018) (Indirect mention earlier)
 Star Wars: Squadrons (2020)
 Star Wars: Battlefront II (2017)
 The Mandalorian (2019–present)
 The Book of Boba Fett (2021–present)
 Star Wars Resistance (2018−2020) (Briefly)
 Star Wars: The Force Awakens (2015) (First appearance)
 Star Wars: The Last Jedi (2017) (Mentioned only)

References

Literature

External links 
 
 

Star Wars governments
Fictional elements introduced in 1977